U.S. Route 431 (US 431) in Tennessee totals an estimated  through Lincoln, Marshall, Maury, Williamson, Davidson, and Robertson Counties in Middle Tennessee.

Route description

Alabama state line to Nashville
US 431 runs concurrently with US 231 upon entry into Tennessee from Madison County, Alabama, where the concurrency begins. The state line also marks the beginning of a secret concurrency with, and the southern terminus of unsigned Tennessee State Route 10. The two U.S. routes plus SR 10 do not split until they reach downtown Fayetteville. While US 231 goes into a north-northeasterly path, US 431 turns northwest into Marshall County, bypassing around Lewisburg, and later into northeastern Maury and into Williamson County. It traverses the city of Franklin, Tennessee before entering the Metropolitan Nashville and Davidson County area.

In Nashville, US 431, being known as Hillsboro Pike, traverses the Exit 3 interchange of I-440, and eventually merging into US 70/SR 1 before entering the downtown area. US 431 then joins US 31 and US 41A onto the James Robertson Parkway. After crossing I-24’s exit 47 interchange, US 431 then follows US 41 (SR 11) and US 31W towards the northern suburbs.

Nashville to the Kentucky state line

US 431, now paired with a secret SR 65 designation, then follows Trinity Lane, crossing the I-65/24 Exit 87 interchange, and turns right onto Whites Creek Pike. A few miles later, it intersects Briley Parkway (SR 155) and Old Hickory Boulevard near Whites Creek. Like most major routes in and out of Nashville, US 431 crosses Old Hickory Boulevard. twice, the first time in the southern suburbs, and the other in the north. US 431/SR 65 continues northward to traverse I-24’s Joelton interchange, exit 35, before entering Robertson County.

It traverses the Springfield area, running concurrently with US 41 (SR 11) through town. It then splits off again, and US 431 continues north to the Kentucky state line, which marks the northern terminus of SR 65.

Concurrencies and secret designations
In Tennessee, when a US highway runs concurrently with a state highway, the state highway’s designation is not signed, but is a secret designation. Along US 431 in Tennessee, the secret designations include: 
SR 10 from the Alabama state line to Fayetteville (in association with US 231) 
SR 50 from Fayetteville to Lewisburg
SR 106 from Lewisburg to the US 70S/SR 1 junction in Nashville
SR 1 in downtown Nashville (in association with US 70S)
SR 24 in downtown Nashville (with US 70) 
SR 11 from downtown Nashville to the Trinity Lane intersection (in association with US 31/41/41A, and US 31W/41, including James Robertson Parkway), and through downtown Springfield (with US 41)  
SR 65 from Nashville to the Kentucky state line 
SR 76 from downtown Springfield to the north side of Springfield.

Major intersections

See also

Roads in Nashville, Tennessee

References

External links
Tennessee Department of Transportation 

 Tennessee
31-4
Transportation in Nashville, Tennessee
Transportation in Davidson County, Tennessee
Transportation in Lincoln County, Tennessee
Transportation in Marshall County, Tennessee
Transportation in Maury County, Tennessee
Transportation in Robertson County, Tennessee
Transportation in Williamson County, Tennessee